Allegheny Wesleyan College (AWC) is a private four-year liberal arts college in Salem, Ohio.

History 
Allegheny Wesleyan College started out in 1943 as a private Methodist school in Salem, Ohio. With increasing enrollment, it purchased the forty-three acre Satterthwaite Farm and erected dormitories, classrooms and a dining hall. At that time, it was known as the Salem Bible Institute or Salem Bible College. It sought out religious affiliation with the Allegheny Wesleyan Methodist Connection (AWMC) in 1973 and it continues to remain supported by the Wesleyan Methodists to this day. In the same year, the Rev. James Beers was appointed as the president of the university, which assumed its current name of Allegheny Wesleyan College.

Admissions 
Allegheny Wesleyan College has an open admissions policy. Its tuition rates for full-time students is $3840 USD.

Academics 

Allegheny Wesleyan College offers the Bachelor of Arts and Associate of Arts degrees in the fields of Elementary Education, Cross-Cultural Missions, Music Education, and Religious Studies.

References

External links 
 Allegheny Wesleyan College

1957 establishments in Ohio
Bible colleges
Holiness universities and colleges
Liberal arts colleges in Ohio
Methodist universities and colleges in the United States
Methodism in Ohio
Private universities and colleges in Ohio